Thomas Sanctuary (1814-1889) was  Archdeacon of Dorset from 1862 until his death on 27 May 1889.

He was educated at Sherborne School and  Exeter College, Oxford and ordained in 1845. He was Rector of Powerstock 
for over 40 years and a Canon Residentiary at Salisbury Cathedral from 1875.

Notes

1815 births
Alumni of Exeter College, Oxford
Archdeacons of Dorset
1889 deaths